Pardisan Park is a complex covering more than 270 hectares, located in the northwest of Tehran. It is connected to Hemmat Expressway in the north, and to Sheikh Nouri Expressway in the east.

History
The original design of the park is attributed to Ian McHarg of the University of Pennsylvania.

The planning phase of the park was begun by Wallace McHarg Roberts & Todd in 1975, under the reign of the last Shah of Iran, Mohammad Reza Pahlavi. Due to the conflicts of the 1979 Revolution, the project was suspended, and the firm was left with a large amount of debt. The site was retained as a green space after the revolution but the designs of Wallace McHarg Roberts & Todd were never implemented.

Facilities
It is primarily an educational, research and cultural center, with the objective of environmental studies, and is a multipurpose project aimed at increasing public awareness about natural environment.

Several animals live in the park; including monkeys, rabbits, and the Pallas's cats. In addition to the wildlife park, the complex contains playgrounds, a theater, and a biodiversity museum.

References

Parks in Tehran